Amara Sy (born 28 August 1981) is a Malian-French former professional basketball player who played at the small forward position.

Professional career
On 31 July 2015, Sy signed with AS Monaco, after a three-year run with ASVEL Basket.

National team career
Sy was a member of the senior Malian national team.

References

External links
Euroleague.net Profile
FIBA Profile
FIBA Europe Profile
Basketball-Reference.com Profile
Eurobasket.com Profile
Spanish League Archive Profile 
French League Profile 

1981 births
Living people
AEK B.C. players
AS Monaco Basket players
ASVEL Basket players
Bakersfield Jam players
Basketball players from Paris
CB Murcia players
French expatriate basketball people in Spain
French men's basketball players
French people of Malian descent
French expatriate sportspeople in Monaco
French expatriate basketball people in the United States
French expatriate basketball people in Monaco
Le Mans Sarthe Basket players
Liga ACB players
Malian men's basketball players
Orléans Loiret Basket players
Paris Basketball players
Small forwards